Acanthopolymastia is a small genus of demosponges belonging to the family Polymastiidae. It has three describe species. These small, bristly, cushion-shaped sponges are only known from deep-sea sites (to a depth of 3400 m) in the southern oceans.

Species

Species include:
Acanthopolymastia acanthoxa (Koltun, 1964)
Acanthopolymastia bathamae Kelly-Borges & Bergquist, 1997
Acanthopolymastia pisiformis Kelly-Borges & Bergquist, 1997

References

Polymastiidae
Taxa named by Patricia Bergquist
Taxa named by Michelle Kelly (marine scientist)
Animals described in 1997